Aswathama is a 2020 Indian Telugu-language action crime film directed by debutant Ramana Teja from a story written by Naga Shourya. Produced by Usha Mulpuri under Ira Creations banner, the film stars Shourya, Mehreen Pirzada, and Jisshu Sengupta while Sargun Kaur Luthra, Harish Uthaman, Prince Cecil and Jayaprakash play supporting roles. Ghibran scored the film with the composed soundtrack composed by Sricharan Pakala.

The film follows Gana (Shourya), a man who returns to India for his sister Priya's (Luthra) marriage. Prior to the function, she attempts suicide, but Gana saves her, eventually finding out she is pregnant and the father of her child is unknown. A desperate Gana starts investigating the case and soon finds himself on the trail of the psychopath responsible for similar more cases.

Released theatrically on 31 January 2020, the film opened to positive reviews from critics who praised the story, action sequences and background score.

Plot
Gana returns to India for his sister Priya's marriage but is shocked to see her trying to commit suicide One night, he learns that she is pregnant but does not know who impregnated her. Gana explains this to her fiancé Ravi, who understands the situation, helps Priya get aborted, and promises to keep this a secret. Gana further convinces Priya to move on and forget about the past, which she does, and she happily gets married. After her marriage, Gana violently fights and interrogates men who troubled Priya in the past, only to learn none of them are behind her impregnation. Soon, another mysteriously impregnated woman named Sadhana commits suicide, and Gana reads her suicide letter explaining she didn't know how she got pregnant without her knowledge. Gana meets her parents and discovers her hospital reports, according to which she fainted 3 months ago and was admitted by someone. Realizing Priya also fainted and was admitted, Gana goes to the hospital and finds out Sadhana was admitted in an emergency by an ambulance. He then learns that more girls named Lakshmi and Monica were also admitted by a similar ambulance.

The next day, Gana's girlfriend Neha informs him about her friend who fainted in the mall and was taken in an ambulance that hasn't arrived at the hospital yet. Gana rushes to the hospital and, with help from the technical department, chases after the ambulances equipped with trackers. He stops many ambulances but doesn't find Neha's friend inside. Soon, he reaches a dead end and abandons his bike. Using his parkour skills, he chases after an ambulance, only to find him looking at another one that isn't being tracked. He ambushes the ambulance, fights off the men inside, and rescues Neha's friend. On the other hand, Dr. Manoj Kumar is a pathologist, who is revealed to be the mastermind behind the pregnant girls. He eliminates the fishermen leaving no trial of elements. Later, Neha questions Gana's recent attitude towards her, forcing him to reveal his mission. 

Soon, a minister's daughter named Sowmya is killed, and her corpse is dropped in front of the police station. With Neha's help, Gana manages to access Sowmya's laptop and receives photos where he spots an older man, Manoj's grandfather. Further, Gana manages to access CCTV footage of Sowmya buying a perfume from a vendor who reveals the older man told him to sell the perfumes and paid him for it. Since Sowmya was a drug addict, she wasn't unconscious despite being subject to anesthesia and thus knew about Manoj. Despite his friend's insistence not to do so, Manoj ended up killing her. Back to the present, the cops ask Manoj to perform an autopsy on Sowmya.

Gana then explains to Neha that all the victims, though unrelated, were admitted to the hospital because of Hypoglycemia induced artificially by a banned drug called Hypomacene. Gana later visits the mall to view surveillance footage and discovers an address that leads him to Manoj's house. Having seen him talk about the autopsy on TV, Gana asks him for help with the case, while Manoj tells him to wait for coffee. Manoj explains to his friend that he'd kill Gana, but receiving a call from Neha about the older man dumping another corpse in front of the police station, Gana secretly runs away. A car chase ensues, resulting in the older man's death after Manoj drops a cargo container on his car. Gana then goes to Manoj's house, where he discovers dead bodies in separate vessels before Manoj arrives there with his friend. Manoj's friend, who turns out to be his father, removes his belt and starts beating him. It is then revealed that Manoj was psychopathic as a kid and even killed his father, who since then appeared as a hallucination. Back to the present, Gana fights with Manoj and beats him. He throws him into a wardrobe, and Gana drops a chandelier over him. Manoj is laughing, but he faints. The chandelier falls over Manoj, killing him. He then receives a call from his father, who pranks him into believing a man is trying to harass Priya. Gana arrives home, and finds out Priya is now pregnant with Ravi's child.

Cast 

 Naga Shourya as Gana
 Mehreen Pirzada as Neha, Gana's love interest
 Jisshu Sengupta as Dr. Manoj Kumar (Voice dubbed by Hemachandra)
 Ankith Koyya as young Dr. Manoj Kumar
 Harish Uthaman  as Kishore
 Sargun Kaur Luthra as Priya, Gana's sister
 Prince Cecil as Ravi, Priya's fiancée
 Aadarsh Balakrishna as Jaga
 Jayaprakash as Gana's father
 Pavitra Lokesh as Gana's mother
 Surekha Vani as Gana's aunt
 Satya as Gana's cousin
 Posani Krishna Murali as Police Chief
 M. S. Bhaskar as Manoj's grandfather
 Sony Sharma as Sony
 Dimpi as Rita
 Heena as Monica 
 Santhoshi Sharma as Sonali. Minster's daughter 
 Anita

Production 
The shooting of the film finished during the last quarter of 2019.

Soundtrack  

The music was composed by Sricharan Pakala, and released on Aditya Music label.

Release 
The film was released on 31 January 2020.

Reception 
The Times of India gave the film three out of five stars and wrote that "Aswathama delivers what it promises – a riveting story and oodles of action. Ramana Teja makes a good debut by sticking to the subject at hand without too much deviation". Praising the action sequences, The Hindu wrote that "The story is ridden with a lot of predictability, be it the screenplay or the clues that are laid out on a platter for the audience".

Home media 
The satellite rights were sold to Gemini TV and was released digitally via Sun NXT and Jio Cinema.

References

External links

2020s vigilante films
2020s Telugu-language films
Indian crime action films
Indian pregnancy films
Indian vigilante films
Films set in Andhra Pradesh
Films scored by Sricharan Pakala
Films shot in Andhra Pradesh
Films set in Visakhapatnam
Films shot in Visakhapatnam
2020s pregnancy films